A nuclear submarine is a submarine powered by a nuclear reactor, but not necessarily nuclear-armed. Nuclear submarines have considerable performance advantages over "conventional" (typically diesel-electric) submarines.  Nuclear propulsion, being completely independent of air, frees the submarine from the need to surface frequently, as is necessary for conventional submarines. The large amount of power generated by a nuclear reactor allows nuclear submarines to operate at high speed for long periods, and the long interval between refuelings grants a range virtually unlimited, making the only limits on voyage times being imposed by such factors as the need to restock food or other consumables.

The limited energy stored in electric batteries means that even the most advanced conventional submarine can only remain submerged for a few days at slow speed, and only a few hours at top speed, though recent advances in air-independent propulsion have somewhat ameliorated this disadvantage. The high cost of nuclear technology means that relatively few of the world's military powers have fielded nuclear submarines. Radiation incidents have occurred within the Soviet submarines including serious nuclear and radiation accidents, but American naval reactors starting with the S1W and iterations of designs have operated without incidents since USS Nautilus (SSN-571) launched in 1954.

History

The idea for a nuclear-powered submarine was first proposed in the United States Navy by the Naval Research Laboratory's physicist Ross Gunn in 1939. The Royal Navy began researching designs for nuclear propulsion plants in 1946.

Construction of the world's first nuclear-powered submarine was made possible by the successful development of a nuclear propulsion plant by a group of scientists and engineers in the United States at the Naval Reactors Branch of the Bureau of Ships and the Atomic Energy Commission. In July 1951, the U.S. Congress authorized construction of the first nuclear-powered submarine, Nautilus, under the leadership of Captain Hyman G. Rickover, USN (sharing a name with Captain Nemo's fictional submarine  in Jules Verne's Twenty Thousand Leagues Under the Sea, and another  that served with distinction in World War II).

The Westinghouse Corporation was assigned to build its reactor. After the submarine was completed at the Electric Boat Company, First Lady Mamie Eisenhower broke the traditional bottle of champagne on Nautilus bow, and the submarine was commissioned , on 30 September 1954. On 17 January 1955, she departed Groton, Connecticut, to begin sea trials. Recognizing the utility of such vessels, the British Admiralty formed plans to build nuclear-powered submarines.

The Soviet Union soon followed the United States in developing nuclear-powered submarines in the 1950s. Stimulated by the U.S. development of Nautilus, Soviets began work on nuclear propulsion reactors in the early 1950s at the Institute of Physics and Power Engineering, in Obninsk, under Anatoliy P. Alexandrov, later to become head of the Kurchatov Institute. In 1956, the first Soviet propulsion reactor designed by his team began operational testing. Meanwhile, a design team under Vladimir N. Peregudov worked on the vessel that would house the reactor.

The United Kingdom's first nuclear-powered submarine  was fitted with an American S5W reactor, provided to Britain under the 1958 US-UK Mutual Defence Agreement. The hull and combat systems of Dreadnought were of British design and construction, although the hull form and construction practices were influenced by access to American designs. During Dreadnoughts construction, Rolls-Royce, in collaboration with the United Kingdom Atomic Energy Authority at the Admiralty Research Station, HMS Vulcan, at Dounreay, developed a completely new British nuclear propulsion system. In 1960, the UK's second nuclear-powered submarine was ordered from Vickers Armstrong and, fitted with Rolls-Royce's PWR1 nuclear plant,  was the first all-British nuclear submarine. Further technology transfers from the United States made Rolls-Royce entirely self-sufficient in reactor design in exchange for a "considerable amount" of information regarding submarine design and quietening techniques transferred from the United Kingdom to the United States. The rafting system for the Valiant class provided the Royal Navy with an advantage in submarine silencing that the United States Navy did not introduce until considerably later.

Nuclear power proved ideal for the propulsion of strategic ballistic missile submarines (SSB), greatly improving their ability to remain submerged and undetected. The Soviets already had several SSBs of the Project 629 (Golf class) and were only a year behind the US with their first SSBN, ill-fated K-19 of Project 658 (Hotel class), commissioned in November 1960. However, this class carried the same three-missile armament as the Golfs. The first Soviet SSBN with 16 missiles was the Project 667A (Yankee class), the first of which entered service in 1967, by which time the US had commissioned 41 SSBNs, nicknamed the "41 for Freedom".

At the height of the Cold War, approximately five to ten nuclear submarines were being commissioned from each of the four Soviet submarine yards (Sevmash in Severodvinsk, Admiralteyskiye Verfi in St.Petersburg, Krasnoye Sormovo in Nizhny Novgorod, and Amurskiy Zavod in Komsomolsk-on-Amur).
From the late 1950s through the end of 1997, the Soviet Union, and later Russia, built a total of 245 nuclear submarines, more than all other nations combined.

Today, six countries deploy some form of nuclear-powered strategic submarines: the United States, Russia, the United Kingdom, France, China, and India. Several other countries including Brazil and Australia have ongoing projects in different phases to build nuclear-powered submarines.

In the United Kingdom, all former and current nuclear submarines of the British Royal Navy (with the exception of three: ,  and ) have been constructed in Barrow-in-Furness (at BAE Systems Submarine Solutions or its predecessor VSEL) where construction of nuclear submarines continues. Conqueror  the only nuclear-powered submarine in the world ever to have engaged an enemy ship with torpedoes, sinking the cruiser  with two Mark 8 torpedoes during the 1982 Falklands War.

Technology
The main difference between conventional submarines and nuclear submarines is the power generation system. Nuclear submarines employ nuclear reactors for this task. They either generate electricity that powers electric motors connected to the propeller shaft or rely on the reactor heat to produce steam that drives steam turbines (cf. nuclear marine propulsion). Reactors used in submarines typically use highly enriched fuel (often greater than 20%) to enable them to deliver a large amount of power from a smaller reactor and operate longer between refuelings – which are difficult due to the reactor's position within the submarine's pressure hull.

The nuclear reactor also supplies power to the submarine's other subsystems, such as for maintenance of air quality, fresh water production by distilling salt water from the ocean, temperature regulation, etc. All naval nuclear reactors currently in use are operated with diesel generators as a backup power system. These engines are able to provide emergency electrical power for reactor decay heat removal, as well as enough electric power to supply an emergency propulsion mechanism. Submarines may carry nuclear fuel for up to 30 years of operation. The only resource that limits the time underwater is the food supply for the crew and maintenance of the vessel.

The stealth technology weakness of nuclear submarines is the need to cool the reactor even when the submarine is not moving; about 70% of the reactor output heat is dissipated into the sea water. This leaves a "thermal wake", a plume of warm water of lower density which ascends to the sea surface and creates a "thermal scar" that is observable by thermal imaging systems, e.g., FLIR. Another problem is that the reactor is always running, creating steam noise, which can be heard on sonar, and the reactor pump (used to circulate reactor coolant), also creates noise, as opposed to a conventional submarine, which can move about on almost silent electric motors.

Lineage

United States Navy

Decommissioned
 SCB-64: 
 SCB-64A: 
 SCB-121: Skate-class attack submarines
 SCB-132: 
 SCB-137A: 
 SCB-154: Skipjack-class attack submarines
 SCB-178: 
 SCB-180A: George Washington-class ballistic missile submarines
 SCB-180: Ethan Allen-class ballistic missile submarines
 SCB-188: Permit-class attack submarines
 SCB-188A: Sturgeon-class attack submarines
 SCB-216: Lafayette-class ballistic missile submarines
 SCB-216: James Madison-class ballistic missile submarines
 SCB-216: Benjamin Franklin-class ballistic missile submarines
 NR-1
 SCB-245: 
 SCB-302:

Operational
 SCB-303: Los Angeles-class attack submarines
 SCB-304:  ballistic missile submarines
 Seawolf-class attack submarines
 Virginia-class attack submarines

Under development
 Columbia-class submarine

Soviet/Russian Navy

Decommissioned
 Project 627 (November) attack submarines
 Project 645 test attack submarine K-27
 Project 658 (Hotel) ballistic missile submarines
 Project 659/675 (Echo) cruise missile submarines
 Project 661 (Papa) attack submarine
 Project 667 (Yankee) ballistic missile submarines
 Project 667B, Murena (Delta I) ballistic missile submarines
 Project 667BD, Murena-M (Delta II) ballistic missile submarines
 Project 670 (Charlie) cruise missile submarines
 Project 671 (Victor) attack submarines
 Project 678 (X-Ray) research submersible
 Project 685 (Mike) attack submarine K-278 Komsomolets
 Project 705 (Alfa) attack submarines

Operational submarines
 Project 667BDR, Kalmar (Delta III) ballistic missile submarines
 Project 667BDRM, Delfin (Delta IV) ballistic missile submarines
 Project 671RTM Shchuka (Victor III) attack submarines
 Project 885 (Yasen) attack submarines
 Project 935 (Borei) ballistic missile submarines
 Project 941 (Typhoon) ballistic missile submarines
 Project 945 (Sierra) attack submarines
 Project 949 (Oscar) cruise missile submarines
 Project 971 (Akula) attack submarines
 Project 1851.1 (Paltus) special purpose submarines
 Project 1910 Kashalot-class (Uniform) special purpose submarines
 Project 1983.1 AS-12 (Losharik) special purpose submarine

Under development

Royal Navy (United Kingdom)

Decommissioned
 
 Valiant-class attack submarines
 Resolution-class ballistic missile submarines
 Churchill-class attack submarines
 Swiftsure-class attack submarines

Operational
 Trafalgar-class attack submarines
 Vanguard-class ballistic missile submarines
 Astute-class attack submarines

Under development
 Dreadnought-class ballistic missile submarines (In development)
 SSN-AUKUS attack submarines

French Navy

Decommissioned
 Redoutable-class ballistic missile submarines

Operational
 Rubis-class attack submarines
 Triomphant-class ballistic missile submarines
 Barracuda-class attack submarines (First boat of the class, Suffren commissioned November 6, 2020)

Under development
 SNLE 3G-class ballistic missile submarines - 4 planned.

Chinese People's Liberation Army Navy

Operational
 Type 091 (Han) attack submarines
 Type 092 (Xia) ballistic missile submarines
 Type 093 (Shang) attack submarines
 Type 094 (Jin) ballistic missile submarines

Under development
 Type 095 attack submarines (In development)
 Type 096 ballistic missile submarines (In development)

Indian Navy

Decommissioned
 INS Chakra (Soviet Charlie-class submarine).
 INS Chakra 2 (Russian Akula-class submarine).

Operational

Arihant-class submarine- Ballistic missile submarines

Under development

Arihant-class submarines- 2 boats under construction.
Project 75 alpha- Attack submarines.
 [[Akula-class submarine|INS 'Chakra 3]]- Attack submarines.
 S5-class- Ballistic missile submarines.

Brazilian Navy

Under development
 Riachuelo-class submarine the first 6,000 tonnes attack submarine, under construction.

Royal Australian Navy

Under development

 Virginia-class attack submarines

 SSN-AUKUS attack submarines

Accidents

Reactor accidents
Some of the most serious nuclear and radiation accidents by death toll in the world have involved nuclear submarine mishaps.  To date, all of these were units of the former Soviet Union. Reactor accidents that resulted in core damage and release of radioactivity from nuclear-powered submarines include:
 K-8, 1960: suffered a loss-of-coolant accident; substantial radioactivity released.
 K-14, 1961: the reactor compartment was replaced due to unspecified "breakdown of reactor protection systems".
 K-19, 1961: suffered a loss-of-coolant accident resulting in 8 deaths and more than 30 other people being over-exposed to radiation. The events on board the submarine are dramatized by the film K-19: The Widowmaker.
 K-11, 1965: both reactors were damaged during refueling while lifting the reactor vessel heads; reactor compartments scuttled off the east coast of Novaya Zemlya in the Kara Sea in 1966.
 K-27, 1968: experienced reactor core damage to one of its liquid metal (lead-bismuth) cooled VT-1 reactors, resulting in 9 fatalities and 83 other injuries; scuttled in the Kara Sea in 1982.
 K-140, 1968: the reactor was damaged following an uncontrolled, automatic increase in power during shipyard work.
 K-429, 1970: an uncontrolled start-up of the ship's reactor led to a fire and the release of radioactivity
 K-116, 1970: suffered a loss-of-coolant accident in the port reactor; substantial radioactivity released.
 K-64, 1972: the first Alfa-class liquid-metal cooled reactor failed; reactor compartment scrapped.
 K-222, 1980: the Papa-class submarine had a reactor accident during maintenance in the shipyard while the ship's naval crew had left for lunch.
 K-123, 1982: the Alfa-class submarine reactor core damaged by liquid-metal coolant leak; the sub was forced out of commission for eight years.
 K-431, 1985: a reactor accident while refueling resulted in 10 fatalities and 49 other people suffered radiation injuries.
 K-219, 1986: suffered an explosion and fire in a missile tube, eventually leading to a reactor accident; a 20-year-old enlisted seaman, Sergei Preminin, sacrificed his life to secure one of the onboard reactors. The submarine sank three days later.
 K-192, 1989 (reclassified from K-131): suffered a loss-of-coolant accident due to a break in the starboard reactor loop.

Other major accidents and sinkings
 , 1963: was lost during deep diving tests with 129 crew and shipyard personnel on board; later investigation concluded that failure of a brazed pipe joint and ice formation in the ballast blow valves prevented surfacing. The accident motivated a number of safety changes to the U.S. fleet. Thresher was the first of only two submarines to exceed 100 onboard deaths, joined by the Russian Kursk's 118 lost in 2000.
 K-3, 1967: the first Soviet nuclear submarine experienced a fire associated with the hydraulic system, killing 39 sailors.
 , 1968: was lost at sea, evidently due to implosion upon sinking. What caused Scorpion'' to descend to its crush depth is not known.
 , 1969: sank while pier-side in shipyard due to improper ballasting. The submarine was eventually completed and commissioned.
 K-8, 1970: a fire and a towing accident resulted in the sub sinking and the loss of all 52 crewmen remaining aboard.
 K-56, 1973: a collision with another Soviet vessel led to flooding of the battery well and many crew deaths due to chlorine gas.
 K-429, 1983: the sub sank to the ocean bottom due to flooding from improper rig-for-dive and shipyard errors but was later recovered; 16 crewmen were killed.
 K-278 Komsomolets, 1989: the Soviet submarine sank in Barents Sea due to a fire.
 K-141 Kursk, 2000: lost at sea with all 118 crewmen on board; the generally accepted theory is that a leak of hydrogen peroxide in the forward torpedo room led to the detonation of a torpedo warhead, which in turn triggered the explosion of half a dozen other warheads about two minutes later.
 Ehime Maru and USS Greeneville, 2001: the American submarine surfaced underneath the Japanese training vessel. Nine Japanese crewmembers, students, and teachers were killed when their ship sank as a result of the collision.
 K-159, 2003: sank in the Barents Sea while being towed to be scrapped, killing nine crewmen.
 , 2005: collided with a seamount in the Pacific Ocean. A crew member was killed and 23 others were injured.
 , 2012: the submarine's forward compartment was destroyed by an arsonist-set fire while in shipyard, causing damage with an estimated $700 million in repair costs.  While repairs were initially planned upon, due to budget cuts the boat was subsequently scrapped.

See also

Notes

References

Further reading

External links

 Nuclear Propulsion – Federation of American Scientists
 60 Years of Marine Nuclear Power: 1955 - 2015 – on The Lyncean Group of San Diego web site
 V.M. Bukhalov – Atomic-powered submarine design 
 Fast Attacks and Boomers: Submarines in the Cold War An online exhibition from the National Museum of American History, Smithsonian Institution
 On Eternal Patrol, website listing all US submarines and submariners lost on duty

American inventions